"It Happened in Sun Valley" is a 1941 song composed by Harry Warren, with lyrics by Mack Gordon. It was recorded and featured by Glenn Miller and his orchestra in the movie Sun Valley Serenade.

Background

Glenn Miller and His Orchestra released the song as an RCA Bluebird 78 rpm single, B-11263-A, in 1941 as a tie-in with the movie, which also featured Glenn Miller and his Orchestra in a performance of the song onscreen with the cast. The B side was "The Kiss Polka", also from the Sun Valley Serenade soundtrack.

While the song makes no mention of Christmas in its lyrics, the winter theme has caused it to become associated with the holiday. Cover versions have been recorded by such artists as André Previn (on his 1955 album Let's Get Away from It All), Jo Stafford (on her 1956 album Ski Trails), the Randy Van Horne Singers (on their 1960 album Sleighride), and Mel Tormé (on his 1992 album Christmas Songs).

A version of the song is featured in the 1999 South Park Album "Mr. Hankey's Christmas Classics", sung by fictional characters Stan Marsh and Wendy Testaburger.

A version of the song was performed by British close harmony singing group The Fraser Hayes Four when they provided the musical interlude during an episode of the long running British comedy radio programme Round The Horne

Chart history

The Glenn Miller RCA Bluebird recording, B-11263-A, with "Vocal Refrain by Paula Kelly, Ray Eberle, Tex Beneke, and The Modernaires, reached #18 on the Billboard chart in 1941.

References

Sources

Flower, John (1972). Moonlight Serenade: a bio-discography of the Glenn Miller Civilian Band. New Rochelle, NY: Arlington House. .
Miller, Glenn (1943). Glenn Miller's Method for Orchestral Arranging. New York: Mutual Music Society. ASIN: B0007DMEDQ
Simon, George Thomas (1980). Glenn Miller and His Orchestra. New York: Da Capo paperback. .
Simon, George Thomas (1971). Simon Says. New York: Galahad. .
Schuller, Gunther (1991). Volume 2 of The Swing Era:the Development of Jazz, 1930–1945 /. New York: Oxford University Press. .

Glenn Miller songs
Songs with lyrics by Mack Gordon
Songs with music by Harry Warren
1941 songs
Jo Stafford songs
Songs written for films
American Christmas songs
South Park songs